Crowder may refer to:

Places in the United States
Crowder, Oklahoma
Crowder, Mississippi
Crowder, Missouri
Crowder College
Fort Crowder

Other uses
Crowder (musician), contemporary Christian musician
Crowder (surname)
Crowder, someone who plays the crwth, a musical stringed instrument

See also
 Crowd (disambiguation)
 Crowders